Seal Bay may refer to:
Antarctica
 Seal Bay (Antarctica)
Australia
Seal Bay (South Australia), a bay on Kangaroo Island
 Seal Bay Aquatic Reserve, a marine protected area on the south coast of Kangaroo Island
 Seal Bay Conservation Park, a protected area on Kangaroo Island
 Seal Bay, South Australia, a locality on Kangaroo Island in Australia
Falkland Islands
 Seal Bay, Falkland Islands
United States
 Seal Bay Seaplane Base, Alaska